George Henry "Jack" Abbott (February 6, 1873 – June 22, 1918) was the head coach of the University of Maine's football team in 1896 and compiled a 1–3–2 record. Also in 1896, Abbott was the head coach of the Maine Black Bears baseball team, which a 5–4 record that season.

Abbott was a native of Manchester, New Hampshire, where he was born in 1873, and resided during his years at Dartmouth. He died at Concord, New Hampshire on June 22, 1918.

Head coaching record

Football

Baseball
The following is a list of Abbott's yearly baseball head coaching records.

References

1873 births
1918 deaths
Dartmouth Big Green baseball players
Dartmouth Big Green football players
Maine Black Bears baseball coaches
Maine Black Bears football coaches
Sportspeople from Manchester, New Hampshire
Baseball players from New Hampshire
Coaches of American football from New Hampshire
Players of American football from New Hampshire